SALPOST (Sierra Leone Postal Services Limited) is the national post office of Sierra Leone.

Sierra Leone Postal Service (SALPOST) Ltd is a member of the Universal Postal Union with a global membership of 192 countries, including British Royal Mail, United States of America’s USPS, China Post, the Panafrican Postal Union (PAPU etc. Sierra Leone officially joined the Universal Postal Union (UPU) on 29 January 1961, ISO Code 3166/Alpha-2:SL.

References

External links
Official website.

Communications in Sierra Leone
Philately of Sierra Leone